Alles Door Oefening Den Haag (Dutch pronunciation: [ˈɑ.ləs doːr ˈu.fə.nɪŋ dɛn ˈɦaːχ]), commonly known by the abbreviated name ADO Den Haag [ˈaː.do dɛn ˈɦaːχ], is a Dutch football club from the city of The Hague. They play their home games at Kyocera Stadion which has a capacity of 15,000. During the 2014–15 season, they competed in the Eredivisie, in which they finished 13th, and the KNVB Cup, where they were knocked out in the second round.

Competitions

Eredivisie

League table

League matches

KNVB Cup

References

External links
Official website of ADO Den Haag 
Groen Geel Hart 
ADOFans.nl 
ADO formations at football-lineups.com 
northside fanside 
ADO for EXPATS | ADO Den Haag news, match reports, photo's and ticket info all in English for the Expat Community 

ADO Den Haag seasons
ADO Den Haag